Patrícia Chládeková (born 4 April 1997) is a Slovak footballer who plays as a goalkeeper for Czech Women's First League club Sparta Prague and the Slovakia women's national team.

References

External links

1997 births
Living people
Women's association football goalkeepers
Slovak women's footballers
Slovakia women's international footballers
2. Frauen-Bundesliga players
1. FC Saarbrücken (women) players
Slovak expatriate footballers
Slovak expatriate sportspeople in Germany
Expatriate women's footballers in Germany
Slovak women's futsal players
AC Sparta Praha (women) players
Slovak expatriate sportspeople in the Czech Republic
Expatriate women's footballers in the Czech Republic
Slovak expatriate sportspeople in Austria
Expatriate women's footballers in Austria
ÖFB-Frauenliga players
FC Neunkirch players
Slovak expatriate sportspeople in Switzerland
Expatriate women's footballers in Switzerland
Czech Women's First League players